Chengguan Town is an urban town in You County, Zhuzhou City, Hunan Province, People's Republic of China.

Administrative divisions  
The town is divided into 12 district: Yongjia District, Shengli District, Xuehua District, Lianxing District, Baihua 
District, Lianxi District, Xige District, Wenhualu District, Fukang  District, Hugongmiao District, Jiangqiao District, and Wanguqiao District.

References

Historic township-level divisions of You County